Kukhar is a Ukrainian language occupational surname literally meaning "the cook".

The surname may refer to:

Galina Kukhar,  Ukrainian figure skating coach and former competitive skater
Roman Kukhar, Ukrainian poet, writer, professor

See also
 

Ukrainian-language surnames